Katarzyna Weronika Borowicz (born 28 June 1985 in Ostrów Wielkopolski, Poland) is a Polish actress, model and beauty pageant titleholder who has competed in the Miss World, Miss Earth and Miss Europe pageants.

In 2004 she won the Miss Poland (Miss Polonia) title, and went on to place Top 5 at Miss World 2004, 2nd Runner-up at Miss Earth 2005 and 3rd Runner-up at Miss Europe 2006.

Since May 2007 she has worked for a Polish television station Lech Poznań, where she is a host of her own program called Babskim okiem (In woman's view).

References 

1985 births
Living people
Miss Earth 2005 contestants
Miss World 2004 delegates
Polish beauty pageant winners
People from Ostrów Wielkopolski
Miss Polonia winners